Fulniô, or Yatê, is a language isolate of Brazil, and the only indigenous language remaining in the northeastern part of that country. The two dialects, Fulniô and Yatê, are very close. The Fulniô dialect is used primarily during a three-month religious retreat. Today, the language is spoken in Águas Belas, Pernambuco.

The language is also called Carnijó, and alternate spellings are Fornió, Furniô, Yahthe, and Iatê.

Classification
Kaufman (1990) classified Fulniô as one of the Macro-Gê languages. However, Eduardo Ribeiro of the University of Chicago, who is working on large-scale classification of Brazilian languages, finds no evidence to support this, and treats it as an isolate.
Jolkesky (2016) again has it as Macro-Je, but Nikulin (2020) again excludes it.

Phonology
Fulniô has the following sounds:

Consonants 
.  is rare.

 A glottal stop  occurs, but is considered epenthetic. 

  can be heard as a velar nasal  before a velar stop. 

  can be heard as a palatal lateral  before a post-alveolar affricate, and can be heard as an alveolar lateral flap  when following fricatives, nasals or stops.

Vowels 

  can be heard as a nasalized sound  when preceding a nasal consonant in closed syllables, or word-finally after a nasal consonant.

All seven have nasalized and glottalized allophones, depending on adjacent consonants. Vowels occur long and short.

Tones are high and low. Contour tones occur allophonically adjacent to voiced consonants. Final syllables tend to lack a tone contrast, and final vowels may be devoiced or dropped.

There are no vowel sequences; vowels either coalesce or are separated by a glottal stop.

Vocabulary

Loukotka (1968)
Loukotka (1968) lists the following basic vocabulary items.

{| class="wikitable sortable"
! gloss !! Fulnio
|-
| head || i-tká
|-
| eye || itó
|-
| tooth || dzyashi
|-
| foot || ishiri
|-
| water || oya
|-
| fire || toːwẽ
|-
| star || tiúyá
|-
| maize || malchi
|-
| jaguar || kléken
|-
| black || chichiá
|}

Nikulin (2020)
Some Yaathê words given by Nikulin (2020), cited from Lapenda (1965, 2005 [1968]), Barbosa (1991), Costa (1999), F. Silva (2011a, 2011b), and Branner (1887).

{| class="wikitable sortable"
! Portuguese gloss (original) !! English gloss (translated) !! Yaathê
|-
| cinza || ashes || fêlôwa
|-
| pé || foot || fêhê
|-
| folha || leaf || ta(-)cʰa
|-
| fígado || liver || ta(-)cô
|-
| dente || tooth || ta(-)xi
|-
| cabelo || hair || li
|-
| água || water || ôːja
|-
| língua || tongue || kts(ʰ)ale
|-
| boca || mouth || ta(-)tʰê
|-
| nariz || nose || kʰletʰa
|-
| olho || eye || tʰô
|-
| orelha || ear || kfakê
|-
| cabeça || head || tkʰa
|-
| fogo || fire || tôwê
|-
| árvore || tree || cʰleka
|-
| semente || seed || kêtʰôja
|-
| ouvir || hear || kfala-
|-
| dormir || sleep || kfafa-
|-
| terra || earth || fê(j)ʔa
|-
| piolho || louse || cfôwa
|-
| pedra || stone || fô(ʔ)a
|-
| chuva || rain || flicja
|-
| mão || hand || koho ~ kʰoja (?)
|-
| caminho || road || tdi
|-
| dar || give || kô-
|-
| estar sentado || be seated || kine-
|-
| estar deitado || lying down || kʰa-
|-
| ir || go || o-, no-
|-
| rabo || tail || ta(-)tô
|-
| carne || meat || ucʰi ~ utxi
|-
| nome || name || ketkʲa
|-
| unha || nail (finger) || kʰôtkʲa
|}

Bibliography
Fulniô (Yahthe) Syntax Structure, Meland & Meland (2009 [1968])
Phonemic Statement of the Fulniô Language, Meland & Meland (2010 [1967])

References

Language isolates of South America
Macro-Jê languages
Indigenous languages of Northeastern Brazil